Robert Allen Ogle (May 28, 1926 – February 25, 1984), known as Bob Ogle, was an American voice actor, animator and writer. Most characters he voiced are performed in the style of Bill Thompson's character Wallace Wimple from Fibber McGee and Molly.

Death
Ogle died suddenly of natural causes in February 1984 during the production of Shirt Tales.

Filmography

Television
 Shirt Tales - Digger the Mole
 The Kwicky Koala Show - Kwicky Koala
 The Pink Panther Show - Harry Halibut (of "Misterjaw")
 What's New Mr. Magoo?   - Mc Barker

Staff work
 A Charlie Brown Celebration - Writer
 Casper and the Angels - Story Editor
 Casper's First Christmas - Story
 Casper Saves Halloween - Story
 Shirt Tales - Writer
 The All-New Popeye Hour - Story, Story Editor
 The Jim Backus Show - Writer
 The Kwicky Koala Show - Writer, Story Director
 Wheelie and the Chopper Bunch - Writer
 Yogi's Gang - Story Director

External links

1926 births
1984 deaths
American male voice actors
20th-century American male actors
American television writers
American male screenwriters
American male television writers
20th-century American male writers
20th-century American screenwriters